A pay grade is a unit in systems of monetary compensation for employment.  It is commonly used in public service, both civil and military, but also for companies of the private sector.  Pay grades facilitate the employment process by providing a fixed framework of salary ranges, as opposed to a free negotiation.  Typically, pay grades encompass two dimensions: a “vertical” range where each level corresponds to the responsibility of, and requirements needed for a certain position; and a “horizontal” range within this scale to allow for monetary incentives rewarding the employee's quality of performance or length of service.  Thus, an employee progresses within the horizontal and vertical ranges upon achieving positive appraisal on a regular basis.  In most cases, evaluation is done annually and encompasses more than one method.

Important employers to use pay grades include:

 U.S. uniformed services pay grades
 U.S. Government pay grades
 United States Foreign Service
 United Nations

"Beyond my pay grade"
The expression "beyond my pay grade" means that the question is one the respondent is not qualified or authorised to answer, that it must be referred to a higher (or better paid) authority for a definitive response.

See also
 Duplicarius
 Doppelsöldner

Wages and salaries
United States military pay and benefits
Military terminology of the United States